George Pastor (born November 23, 1963) is a former U.S. soccer forward who was a prolific indoor soccer goal scorer.  He also earned seven caps with the U.S. national team in 1988 and 1989.

Indoor career
Pastor’s reputation rests largely on his highly successful indoor soccer career.   In 1986, he signed with the Milwaukee Wave of the American Indoor Soccer Association.  Over his five seasons in Milwaukee, he scored a team record 174 goals.  In 1991, he moved to the St. Louis Storm of Major Soccer League (MSL) for the 1991-1992 season. The Storm folded at the end of the season.

Outdoor career
In 1986, Pastor joined the San Jose Earthquakes of the Western Soccer Alliance (WSA).  He spent the next two seasons with the Earthquakes as they lost the WSA championship game in both 1987 and 1988.  The team folded at the end of the 1988 season and Pastor signed with the San Francisco Bay Blackhawks for the 1989 season.  After only one year with the Blackhawks, he moved to the Salt Lake Sting of the American Professional Soccer League in 1990.  The Sting folded after the 1991 season.

Without a professional club in 1992, Pastor moved to the semi-pro San Jose Oaks.  That year, the Oaks won the U.S. Open Cup.

National team
Pastor earned seven caps with the U.S. national team in 1988 and 1989.  His first game with the national team came in a 1–1 tie with Chile on June 1, 1988.  He played one World Cup qualification game, another 1-1 tie, this time with Trinidad and Tobago on May 13, 1989.  Pastor’s last game with the national team was as a substitute for Paul Caligiuri on June 24, 1989, a 1–0 loss to Colombia.

Coaching
Since retiring from playing professionally, Pastor has coached several youth teams.  He is currently a staff coach with the Mavericks soccer club.

References

External links
 Mavericks profile

Living people
Sportspeople from Lima
Peruvian emigrants to the United States
American Indoor Soccer Association players
American Professional Soccer League players
American soccer coaches
American soccer players
Major Indoor Soccer League (1978–1992) players
Milwaukee Wave players
National Professional Soccer League (1984–2001) players
Salt Lake Sting players
San Francisco Bay Blackhawks players
San Jose Earthquakes (1974–1988) players
San Jose Oaks players
St. Louis Storm players
Western Soccer Alliance players
United States men's international soccer players
1963 births
Association football forwards